Giuseppe Francesco Carlo Koschier (born 16 March 1936) is an Austrian football midfielder who played for Austria in the 1960 European Nations' Cup. He also played for 1. Simmeringer SC.

References

1936 births
Austrian footballers
Austria international footballers
Association football midfielders
Footballers from Vienna
Living people